Butorlino is a rural locality (a village) in Styopantsevskoye Rural Settlement, Vyaznikovsky District, Vladimir Oblast, Russia. The population was 531 as of 2010. There are 10 streets.

Geography 
Butorlino is located on the Tetrukh River, 49 km southwest of Vyazniki (the district's administrative centre) by road. Usady is the nearest rural locality.

References 

Rural localities in Vyaznikovsky District